Para vestir santos is a 1955 Argentine romantic drama film directed by Leopoldo Torre Nilsson, from a screenplay by Sixto Pondal Ríos and Carlos Olivari. It stars Tita Merello, Jorge Salcedo, Tomás Simari, José de Ángelis, Myriam de Urquijo and Beatriz Taibo.

Cast
 Tita Merello as Martina Brizuela
 Jorge Salcedo as José Luis Ordóñez
 Tomás Simari as Don Aldo
 José de Ángelis
 Myriam de Urquijo
 Beatriz Taibo as Carlota Brizuela
 Frank Nelson as Pichín Brizuela
 Alba Mujica as Donata

External links
 

1955 films
1955 romantic drama films
Argentine black-and-white films
Argentine romantic drama films
Films directed by Leopoldo Torre Nilsson
1950s Argentine films